William Henry Powis (1808–1836) was a British wood engraver. He was regarded as one of the best in the profession in his day. His early death at age 28, according to William James Linton, was caused by consumption.

Life
Powis was born in London, and trained by George Wilmot Bonner. He then worked for John Jackson, who may have published some of Powis's wood-engravings as his own.

Works

Powis's wood-engravings appeared as illustrations in:

 Francis Douce, The Dance of Death (1833), after Hans Holbein (with Bonner);
 James Northcote, Fables;
 Edward Turner Bennett, The Gardens and Menageries of the Zoological Society Delineated (1830–31);
 John Martin and Richard Westall's Pictorial Illustrations of the Bible, (1833); 
Thomas Scott's Bible, edition of 1834.

Notes

Attribution

1808 births
1836 deaths
English engravers